In constraint satisfaction, constraint inference is a relationship between constraints and their consequences.

Some operations on constraints produce a new constraint that is a consequence of them.

Constraint projection restricts the effects of a constraint to some of its variables. Given a constraint  its projection to a subset  of its variables is the constraint  that is satisfied by an evaluation if this evaluation can be extended to the other variables in such a way the original constraint  is satisfied.

Extended composition is similar in principle to composition, but allows for an arbitrary number of possibly non-binary constraints; the generated constraint is on an arbitrary subset of the variables of the original constraints. Given constraints  and a list  of their variables, the extended composition of them is the constraint  where an evaluation of  satisfies this constraint if it can be extended to the other variables so that  are all satisfied.

See also

Constraint satisfaction problem

References

 
 
 

Constraint programming
Inference